Lightning was a clipper ship, one of the last really large clippers to be built in the United States.  She was built by Donald McKay for James Baines of the Black Ball Line, Liverpool, for the Australia trade.

It has been said that Lightning was the most extreme example of a type of ship classified as an extreme clipper.

Her builder was the famous Donald McKay of Boston, a follower of John Willis Griffiths and his principles of ship design. Lightning is a prime example of a change in thinking that turned builders away from shaping ships' hulls like cod's heads and mackerel tails. She had  of concavity in her bows and a beautiful fine run, yet she also had a moderate deadrise and a good full midsection with tumblehome, allowing her to be fast yet stable, with good sail-carrying ability.

History 
When Lightning was built in 1854 in Boston, America's clipper boom was on the wane. The Australian gold rush was on, however, and McKay was building ships for James Baines of the Black Ball Line (house flag featured a black disk ("ball") on a red background) in Liverpool. Baines needed to transport passengers and cargo to Australia and had been impressed by the huge American ships. Lightning was powerfully and heavily constructed to handle the heavy seas and storms of the Australian run. Only the finest materials went into her construction. She cost £30,000 to build, and Baines put in another £2,000 in interior decoration, adding fine woods, marble, gilding and stained glass. It is said that her rooms rivaled those of the later Queen Mary. An on-ship newspaper called the Lightning Gazette was published for the passengers and crew.

After arriving in England, Lightning'''s hollow bow was ignorantly filled in by her captain Anthony Enright. McKay called the people who did it "the wood butchers of Liverpool". When the famous James "Bully" Forbes became her captain, he drove her mercilessly, often running with the lee rail underwater, and the fillings soon washed out. Lightning began to set records. She crossed from New York to Liverpool in 13 days, 19½ hours, and she sailed  in 24 hours, doing 18 to 18½ knots. In 1854–55, she made the passage from Melbourne to Liverpool in 65 days, completing a circumnavigation of the world in 5 months, 9 days, which included 20 days spent in port.Lightning did a brief stint as a troop ship, taking British soldiers from England to India (in 87 days) to fight the 1857 Indian Mutiny.

In 1867, she was purchased by Thomas Harrison of Liverpool.

At around 01:00 on 30 October 1869, Lightning caught fire at Geelong in Australia, when she was fully loaded and ready to sail with 4,300 bales of wool, 200 tons of copper, 35 casks of wine, and some tallow. Attempts to control the fire were unsuccessful, so at around noon the decision was taken to sink her. She was towed out to the shoals in Corio Bay where initial attempts to hole her below the waterline with cannon fire from the shore were unsuccessful. The shoals became known as "Lightning Shoals".

Affiliations
TS Lightning, Australian Navy Cadets - (Former Unit)

 References 

External links

Sailing Ships: Lightning
Voyage of the Clipper Ship Lightning from England to Australia and Back
Lightning data
  illustrated account of the clipper Lightning''

 

Individual sailing vessels
Ships built in Boston
Ships designed by Donald McKay
Age of Sail merchant ships of the United States
Victorian-era passenger ships of the United Kingdom
Troop ships of the United Kingdom
Maritime incidents in October 1869
Shipwrecks of Victoria (Australia)
1854 ships
Full-rigged ships
Extreme clippers